The 2021 6 Hours of Monza was an endurance sports car racing event held at Autodromo Nazionale di Monza, Monza, Italy, on 18 July 2021. It served as the third round of the 2021 FIA World Endurance Championship and was the first running of the event as part of the championship.

Qualifying

Qualifying Results
Pole position winners in each class are marked in bold.

Race

Race Result 
The minimum number of laps for classification (70% of the overall winning car's race distance) was 142 laps.

Standings after the race 

2021 Hypercar World Endurance Drivers' Championship

2021 Hypercar World Endurance Championship

 Note: Only the top five positions are included for the Drivers Championship standings.

2021 LMP2 World Endurance Drivers' Championship

2021 LMP2 World Endurance Championship

 Note: Only the top five positions are included for the Drivers Championship standings.

2021 World Endurance GTE Drivers' Championship

2021 World Endurance GTE Manufacturers' Championship

 Note: Only the top five positions are included for the Drivers Championship standings.

References

Monza
2021 in Italian motorsport
Sport in Monza